D48 or D-48 may refer to:
 85 mm antitank gun D-48, a 1955 Soviet 85-mm calibre antitank gun
 D48 motorway (Czech Republic)
 D48 road (Croatia)
 , a Leander-class light cruiser of the Royal Australian Navy
 , a Nairana-class escort carrier of the Royal Navy
 , a Bogue-class escort carrier of the Royal Navy
 , a V-class destroyer of the Royal Navy
 Semi-Slav Defense, a chess opening
 D48, a precision color film recorder manufactured by Dicomed